Kirenia Ballar Bell (born in Havana) is a beach volleyball player from Cuba, who participated in the NORCECA Beach Volleyball Circuit in 2007, playing with Ion Canet, and 2009, with Nirian Sinal.

At the 2nd ALBA Games she won the silver medal, playing with Nirian Sinal. She also won the gold medal at the Cuban National Games in 2008, playing with Kirenia Reina.

References

 
 

Year of birth missing (living people)
Living people
Cuban beach volleyball players
Women's beach volleyball players